King Thong Lan was a king of Ayutthaya, an ancient kingdom in Thailand.

A son of Borommarachathirat I and member of the House of Suphannaphum, Thong Lan succeeded his father to the throne of Ayutthaya in 750 LE (1931 BE, 1388/89 CE) at the age of 15. Having reigned for only seven days, he was deposed and executed in a coup by Ramesuan, his relative from the House of Uthong.

Thong Lan was the first monarch of Ayutthaya to be executed.

Name

The child king is known as Thong Lan in most historical sources, including the British Museum Chronicle, the Luang Prasoet Chronicle, and the Phan Channumat Chronicle.

Thong means "gold". Lan is an archaic word whose meaning is not known.

Historian Suchit Wongthet expressed the opinion that lan here is an old Thai–Lao term which encyclopediae say refers to "eel trap made of bamboo". The historian stated that naming a person after an animal trapping device was an ancient practice, citing the personal name of King Rama I, Thong Duang, which means "golden snare".

The Bradley Chronicle, however, says the name of the boy king was Thong Lan ("cry of stomach").

Thong Lan is known as Thong Chan ("golden moon" or "moon gold") in the Phonnarat Chronicle and the Royal Autograph Chronicle.

In the Minor Wars Chronicle, he is referred to in Pali as Suvaṇṇacanda (in Thai script: สุวณฺณจนฺท; "golden moon").

The Van Vliet Chronicle, a Dutch document written by Jeremias Van Vliet in 1640 CE, refers to him as Thong t'Jan.

Family

All historical documents say Thong Lan was a son of Borommarachathirat I.

Life

Political background

The Kingdom of Ayutthaya was jointly founded by the royal houses of Uthong and Suphannaphum, which were related through marriage. The first monarch of Ayutthaya, Ramathibodi I, was from Uthong. He appointed his son, Ramesuan, the ruler of Lop Buri. He also appointed Boromrachathirat I, his relative from Suphannaphum, the ruler of Suphan Buri.

In 731 LE (1912 BE, 1369/70 CE), Ramathibodi I died. Ramesuan came from Lop Buri and succeeded to the throne of Ayutthaya.

In 732 LE (1913 BE, 1370/71 CE), Borommarachathirat I marched his army from Suphan Buri to Ayutthaya. Ramesuan then "presented" the throne to him and returned to Lop Buri as before.

Reign

In 750 LE (1931 BE, 1388/89 CE), Boromrachathirat I led his army to attack Chakangrao. But he fell ill and died en route. His son, Thong Lan, then succeeded to the throne of Ayutthaya.

Thai chronicles state that Thong Lan was 15 years of age when he ascended the throne in 750 LE (1931 BE, 1388/89 CE). Based on this information, Thong Lan was possibly born in 735 LE (1916 BE, 1373/74 CE). But the Dutch document Van Vliet Chronicle says he was 17 when ascending the throne.

After Thong Lan had reigned for merely seven days, Ramesuan came from Lop Buri with his army and seized the throne. Ramesuan had Thong Lan put to death at a Buddhist temple called Wat Khok Phraya. Thong Lan was killed by hitting his neck with a Sandalwood club, a traditional means for executing a royal person. Ramesuan then became king of Ayutthaya for the second time.

Historian Damrong Rajanubhab introduced a theory that Boromrachathirat I brought his army to Ayutthaya in 732 LE because of certain political problems that Ramesuan was unable to deal with. The two might have agreed that Ramesuan would let Boromrachathirat rule Ayutthaya and the latter would declare the former his successor. Ramesuan thus presented the throne of Ayutthaya to Boromrachathirat and returned to his old base, Lop Buri. But when it appeared that the agreement was breached and Boromrachathirat was instead succeeded by his son, Thong Lan, Ramesuan then seized the throne and killed Thong Lan.

Modern scholars believe otherwise. Suchit Wongthet expressed the opinion that Boromrachathirat's arrival in Ayutthaya with troops was apparently to "seize power by means of military force (called coup in our days)" and Ramesuan returned to Lop Buri just to accumulate more power and wait for an opportunity to strike back. Pramin Khrueathong also believed that Boromrachathirat used military strength to force Ramesuan out of the throne, saying this was probably why Ramesuan took revenge on Boromrachathirat's young son, Thong Lan, killing the child violently.

These events were part of a series of conflicts between the houses of Uthong and Suphannaphum that would continue until Suphannaphum achieved decisive victory over Uthong at the end of Ramrachathirat's reign, allowing Suphannaphum to remain in power over the Kingdom of Ayutthaya for almost the next two centuries.

Ancestry

References

Bibliography

 
 
 
 
 
 
 
 
 
 
 
 
 
 

14th-century monarchs in Asia
Child monarchs from Asia
Executed Thai monarchs
Assassinated Thai people
Kings of Ayutthaya
Leaders ousted by a coup
Monarchs deposed as children
Monarchs who died as children
Suphannaphum dynasty
Princes of Ayutthaya
Executed children
14th-century Thai people
Year of birth missing
Year of death missing